Damascus attack may refer to:

1949 Menarsha synagogue attack, Damascus
1981 Azbakiyah bombing
1986 Damascus bombings
2008 Damascus car bombing
2011 Damascus bombings
January 2012 al-Midan bombing
March 2012 Damascus bombings
April 2012 Damascus bombings
10 May 2012 Damascus bombings
18 July 2012 Damascus bombing
February 2013 Damascus bombings
5 September 2016 Syria bombings
March 2017 Damascus bombings
Southern Damascus offensive (January–February 2018)
2018 missile strikes against Syria
Southern Damascus offensive (March 2018)
2019 Damascus airstrike
2021 Damascus bus bombing
July 2022 Damascus airstrikes
September 2022 Damascus airstrikes
2023 Damascus airstrike

See also
List of terrorist attacks in Damascus
Rif Dimashq offensive (disambiguation), a number of offensives
Siege of Damascus (634)
Siege of Damascus (1148)
Siege of Damascus (1400)
Capture of Damascus, 1918
Battle of Damascus (1941)
Battle of Damascus (2012)